Independent, formerly The Gallup Independent is a daily newspaper in Gallup, New Mexico, covering local news, sports, business, jobs, and community events. The newspaper is published six days a week – Monday through Saturday. The Independent'''s motto is "The Truth Well Told". The newspaper covers Gallup and the surrounding communities of McKinley County, New Mexico.

History

The original Gallup Independent began publication under the auspice of the Independent Print Co. some time before 1923, then merged with the Carbon City News, becoming the semi-weekly Gallup Independent and Carbon City News, which was published by the Gallup Printers until 1931. In 1924, the paper once again became the Gallup Independent and published weekly until 1931, when it merged with the year-old Gallup Evening Herald, published by Clyde Earl Ely, who would serve as commanding officer of the 200th Coast Artillery, and became the Gallup Independent and Evening Herald, which was published by the Gallup Independent Print Co. In 1936, the paper became a daily (except Sunday) paper, and reverted to the original Gallup Independent name. The Gallup Independent was published by Gallup Independent Newspapers until 1956. In 1956, the paper took over J.M. Richards' weekly Gallup Times, which had started printing in 1954, and became the Gallup Independent and Gallup Times, which printed for one year, until it changed its name to the Gallup Daily Independent, published by New Mexico Newspapers. In 1964, the paper once again changed its name, this time to Independent, which the paper has been known as since.

The newspaper is owned by Gallup Independent, Co., which also publishes the free weekly Navajo Nation Messenger, which targets the local Navajo population in Gallup and surrounding areas.

Mendoza rape articles

On June 24, 2009, Independent published an article revealing that Gallup mayor Harry Mendoza had been charged in a gang rape in 1948. Mendoza and his family said they knew nothing of the charges, and the case had never gone to court. In 2011 Mendoza sued the Gallup Independent for false light and in July 2012 a district court judge ruled in the newspaper's favor after a jury failed to reach a verdict.http://www.gallupindependent.com/2009/06June/062409rapecharge.html  Gallup Independent: Rape charge still active

On January 6, 2010, Independent publisher Bob Zollinger and Mendoza got into an altercation in the parking lot of a bank. Zollinger told a local television station that he never threw a punch and was attacked by Mendoza, who was upset about the publication of articles linking the mayor to a gang rape 60 years ago. On July 20, 2010, Mendoza pleaded no contest to a charge of voluntarily engaging in a fight in a public place. This was a lesser charge than the original misdemeanor assault and battery charges that the mayor had faced.

AwardsThe Gallup Independent'' earned awards by the New Mexico Press Association for editorial writing in 2012, 2013 and 2014, news coverage in 2013 and 2014, public service in 2014, breaking news in 2014, headline writing in 2011, 2012, 2013 and 2014, sports photography in 2014, feature photography in 2014 and photo series in 2014. Also in 2014 two of the newspaper's correspondents were awarded by the New Mexico Press Women and the National Press Women for  investigative reporting, enterprise reporting and column writing for their work in the Gallup Independent.

References

External links
 

Newspapers published in New Mexico
Gallup, New Mexico